is a former Japanese football player and manager.

Playing career
Yasuhara was born in Aichi Prefecture on August 9, 1968. After graduating from Osaka University of Commerce, he joined his local club Toyota Motors (later Nagoya Grampus Eight) in 1991. Although he debuted in 1993, he could hardly play in the match. In 1995, he moved to Uruguay and joined River Plate Montevideo. In 1996, he returned to Japan and joined Japan Football League club Honda. Although the club won the champions in 1996, he could hardly play in the match. He could not play at all in the match from 1998 and retired end of 1999 season.

Coaching career
After retirement, Yasuhara started coaching career at Honda in 2000. In 2004, he became a manager for Tokai Gakuen University and managed until 2011. In 2006, he also became a manager Japan Football League club FC Kariya. However he was sacked in June 2007.

Club statistics

References

External links

J.League

1968 births
Living people
Osaka University of Commerce alumni
Association football people from Aichi Prefecture
Japanese footballers
Japan Soccer League players
J1 League players
Japan Football League (1992–1998) players
Japan Football League players
Nagoya Grampus players
Club Atlético River Plate (Montevideo) players
Honda FC players
Japanese football managers
Association football midfielders